Ironhedge is a role-playing game published by Empire Wargames in 1979.

Description
Ironhedge is a fantasy system with fully compatible supplements for other genres: western, science fiction, and gangsters. The rulebook (two copies included in the Ironhedge Complete Game) is pocket-sized; the rules are very concise. Campaign-setting and scenario material are presented on 72 cards (3" x 5"), printed with very small illustrations and text. Each card has a short description of a region or a small encounter area. The Ironhedge Complete Game also includes encounter form cards and character record cards. There is no art on the black box cover of the 1st edition. The 2nd edition is revised for clarity.

Publication history
Ironhedge was designed by John Brooke, and published by Empire Wargames in 1979 as the Ironhedge Manifesto, a 40-page digest-sized book. The second edition was published in 1983 as two small (4" x 6") booklets (40-page revised Ironhedge, plus 1st-edition Westhedge). The third edition was published in 1985 as a small (4" x 6") booklet (40 pages, revised again). The fourth edition was published in 1987 as a small (3 1/2" x 5") 40-page book (revised again) with 18 cards, that was sold separately or as part of the Ironhedge Complete Game, which was a digest-sized box containing two small (3 1/2" x 5") 40-page books (4th-edition rules), a color cardstock map, 72 color cards, 36 form cards, dice, and a pencil. The fifth edition was published in 1989 as a small (3 1/2" x 5") 40-page book (revised some more) with 18 cards, that was sold separately or as part of the Ironhedge Complete Game.

Reception
Lawrence Schick comments on the game's "undistinguished D&D-inspired rules, notable for its unusual format and for the author's eccentric philosophical rants. The rules and scenario material are laced with quasi-Libertarian slogans and doggerel, especially in the first four editions. (Example: 'In another time/In another place/Lived a worthless/Human race/Lotsa jewels/And lotsa gold/Kinda rich/And sorta old.' Pretty catchy, eh?)" Schick also notes that the 2nd edition of the boxed set (with 5th-edition rules) "unfortunately lacks much of the unique eccentricity of the earlier editions".

Reviews
White Wolf #12 (1988)

References

Role-playing games introduced in 1979
Universal role-playing games